A Tibetan Love Song is a 2010 Chinese romance film starring Alec Su, Ju Wenpei, Purba Rgyal, Zhang Guangbei, Ariel Aisin-Gioro, Lau Yiwei, Chen Daolin, and Yuan Wenting.  It was released on 5 November 2010 in China.

See also
 Kangding Qingge

External links

Chinese romance films
2010 romance films
2010 films
Kangding
Films set in Sichuan